Victoriano Guisasola y Menendez J.C.D. (21 April 1852 – 2 September 1920) was a Cardinal of the Roman Catholic Church and an archbishop of Toledo and Primate of Spain.

Early life and priesthood
Victoriano Guisasola y Menendez was born in Oviedo, Spain. He was the nephew of Victoriano Guisasola Rodríguez, Archbishop of Santiago de Compostela.  He was educated at the Seminary of Oviedo where he earned a licentiate in theology and a doctorate in canon law at the University of Oviedo.

He was ordained in 1876 by his uncle. He served as Professor of canon law at the Seminary of Ciudad Real from 1876 until 1882. He was chancellor-secretary to his uncle the bishop of Orihuela from 1882 until 1884. He served as vicar general of Orihuela until 1886.

Episcopate 
He was appointed as bishop of Osma on 15 June 1893 by Pope Leo XIII. He was consecrated on 1 October 1893 at the cathedral of Santiago de Compostela by José María Martín de Herrera y de la Iglesia, Cardinal Archbishop of Compostela. He was transferred to the Diocese of Jaén on 19 April 1897. He was appointed in 1899 as a Senator of the kingdom, a post he held until his death. He was transferred to the diocese of Madrid in December 1901. He was promoted to Archdiocese of Valencia on 14 December 1905. He was finally transferred to the metropolitan and primatial see of Toledo on 1 January 1914 by Pope Pius X.

Cardinalate 
He was made a cardinal in the consistory of 25 May 1914 but Pius X did not assign him a title before his death; his successor, Pope Benedict XV, made him the Cardinal-Priest of Santi Quattro Coronati (the pope's former title). He received the red biretta from King Alfonso XIII of Spain on June 3 of that year. He participated in the conclave of 1914 that elected Pope Benedict XV. He died in 1920 while still in office and is buried at the chapel of the Seminary of Toledo.

References

1852 births
1920 deaths
People from Oviedo
20th-century Spanish cardinals
19th-century Roman Catholic bishops in Spain
Bishops of Jaén
Bishops of Osma
Archbishops of Toledo
University of Oviedo alumni
University of Salamanca alumni
Cardinals created by Pope Pius X
Bishops of Madrid